Televizija 5 or TV 5 HD is Bosnian local cable commercial television channel based in Sarajevo. TV station was established in 2016 and it broadcasts religious and educational program. Program is mainly produced in the Bosnian language in high definition.

References

External links

 Official website of Communications Regulatory Agency of Bosnia and Herzegovina

Mass media in Sarajevo
Television stations in Bosnia and Herzegovina
Television channels and stations established in 2016